Sir Parashurambhau College (S.P. College) is an Autonomous (since 2019) college in Pune, Maharashtra, India. Established in 1916, as New Poona College at the hands of the British Governor Lord Willingdon. The college was renamed as Sir Parashurambhau College as a mark of gratitude towards the then ruler of Jamkhandi State who donated Rs. Two lakhs in the memory of his father, Parashurambhau Patwardhan. The college is governed by Shikshan Prasarak Mandali, a private education society in Maharashtra. S. P. College provides a platform for cultural activities and promotes students to cultivate their skills. The present site of the college was leased to the Shikshan Prasarak Mandali by Shri. Sardar Jagannath Maharaj Pandit at the request of Lokmanya Bal Gangadhar Tilak.SP College also offering many platforms to overall personality development of students.

Academics
Arts
Science
Commerce
Interdisciplinary Sciences
Computer Science
Business Administration
Skill development center

Community
Sir Parashurambhau College is situated in Pune. Located in the heart of the city, S.P. College is one of the oldest and most respected colleges in Pune with many notable alumni. The college is large and diverse, admitting students from across Pune, India and the state of Maharashtra.

Educational offering
Sir Parashurambhau College offers education from junior college (grade 11-12) to postgraduate (Masters) level. The highschool is known as the Junior College. India follows a 10+2 education system with students electing one out of three fields of specialization, namely Science, Arts and Commerce (Business) in grades 11–12. The junior college enrolls about 3800 students, out of which about 1600 students are of the Science stream in standards 11–12. There are 7 divisions per grade (for the Science stream) from A through G. The college, which was established in 1916 with humble origins, now has a campus spanning 25 acres (0.04 sq miles) with sprawling grounds, heritage buildings, botanical gardens and a swimming pool. Sir Parashurambhau College is affiliated to the Maharashtra State Board of Secondary and Higher Secondary Education (MSBSHSE). Students appear for the HSC examination for matriculation from the school. Although an independent school, the SP Junior College receives periodic financial grants from the Maharashtra State Government.

Curriculum
Students of the Science stream take compulsory courses in the following subjects: English, Physics, Chemistry, Environmental Science, Physical Education. They can opt for 2 or 3 of the following subjects: Mathematics, Biology, Marathi, German, Hindi, Geography, Computer Science and Application, Scooter and Motorcycle Servicing, Electronics, Electrical Maintenance, Mechanical Maintenance. Students of the Arts stream take compulsory courses in the following subjects: English, Marathi or Hindi or German or Sanskrit, Environmental Science, Health and Physical Education. They can opt for 4 of the following subjects: Economics, Mathematics, History, Psychology, Logic, Geography, Political Science, German, Sanskrit, Hindi, Marathi. (Students can select a maximum of 3 languages) Students of the Commerce (Business) stream take compulsory courses in the following subjects: English, Marathi or Hindi or Sanskrit or German, Environmental Science, Physical Education. They can opt for 4 of the following subjects: Economics, Mathematics, Secretarial Practice, Organization of Commerce, Book-keeping and Accountancy. College is for 6.5 hours a day with 9 classes of 40–45 minutes each. Promotion to the next grade is based on a minimum of 35% marks in each subject throughout the academic year. Science students have first-hand laboratory experience once a week in each of their chosen subjects among the following: Physics, Chemistry, Biology, Computer
Science, Electronics, Electrical Maintenance, Mechanical Maintenance, Scooter and Motorcycle Servicing.

Junior College Gradation System
Grades are awarded according to marks (percentage) scored by the students. Grade points (percentage) are awarded on a 100-point scale. There are 4 exams each year, viz. 2 tutorials (unit tests)- one in each semester, 1 terminal exam (at the end of 1 st semester) and 1 annual exam. All of these exams taken throughout the academic year count towards the final score on a 100-point scale or percentage scale. At the end of Grade 12, students appear for board exams, which are statewide public examinations whose scores are considered very important, as they are one of the criteria used for admission into various universities.

Student Life and Culture

Activities
Students can join various cultural, academic, and social clubs such as:
Book Club, Art Circle, 'Vaadsabha':The debating union, ‘Dandekar Adhyasan’, ‘Vangmay
Mandal’, Marathi literature club, Dr. Ambedkar Study Circle, Science
Association, Commerce Association, Film club, ‘Urmee’, Arts and
Culture Club, ‘Calyx’, Trends in arts and sciences magazine, Adventure
Club, Toastmasters International club as will as government programs NSS, 3 mah armd sqn NCC, 36 MHA BN NCC Army wing, 3 Mah Naval unit Div no :- vi, etc.

Athletics
Students can participate in a variety of indigenous and international
games such as: kho-kho, kabaddi, hockey, baseball, volleyball, Dodgeball, football (soccer), etc. in district to national level competitions. SP
College has official teams participating in competitive sports on an
inter-school and intercollegiate level.

MAVEN - Gaining the Edge

MAVEN is a skill and entrepreneurship development event conducted by SP College on a National level. It is one of the only Corporate Events happening on a college level in the city. Students participate as volunteers and work on the event, right from planning to execution. It is generally scheduled to happen in mid-January every year.

Notable alumni

Baburaoji Parkhe 1912 - 1997, Paper & Pulp Industry, Writer and Philanthropist
Dr Sarojini Babar 1920 - 2008,
 Member of Parliament , Member of 
 legislative assembly , Prominent 
 Writer and Folkliterator
 Anand Modak 1951- 2014, music composer
 Y.K. Sohoni (1911-2003), Professor of French and recipient of Chevalier dans l'Ordre Palmes Académiques from the Government of France.
Gauri Pradhan, TV Actress
 Mrinal Dev-Kulkarni, TV Actress
 Mukta Barve, Marathi film actress
 Shanta Shelke, author
 Madhura Datar, singer
 Pandurang Sadashiv Sane
 Siddharth Chandekar, Actor
 Mrunmayee Deshpande, Actress
 Ritika Shrotri, Actress
 Shivrampant Damle (1900–1977), Indian educationist

References

External links
 S. P. College Official website

Universities and colleges in Pune
Colleges affiliated to Savitribai Phule Pune University
Educational institutions established in 1916
1916 establishments in India